So It's You is a 2014 Filipino romantic comedy film starring Carla Abellana, Tom Rodriguez and JC de Vera. It is written and directed by Jun Lana. It was released on May 7, 2014, by Regal Entertainment.

The film is about a pair of broken-hearted people who meet and begin a relationship, but their painful pasts hang over their romance.

Synopsis
Lira (Carla Abellana) was left at the altar by her fiancée Tony (JC de Vera). Cobbler Goryo (Tom Rodriguez) has just given up hope on getting back together with the mother of his child. The two meet by chance, and come to bond over their respective heartbreak. Goryo agrees to pose as Lira’s boyfriend in hopes of making her now-married former fiancée jealous. Things get complicated when the two start falling in over for real, even as Lira continues to dream of reuniting with Tony.

Cast
Carla Abellana as Lira Joy Macaspac
Tom Rodriguez as Goryo Acuyong
JC de Vera as Tony Ferrer
Bangs Garcia as Rose
Leo Martinez  as Tiyo Carding
Joey Marquez as Dado
Paolo Ballesteros as LA
Kevin Santos as Jojo
Arlene Muhlach as Ditas
Marc Justine Alvarez as Nonoy
Gee Canlas as Pauleen 
Patricia Ismael as Eva
Ahwel Paz as Nurse

See also
 List of Filipino films in 2014

References

External links
 

2014 films
Philippine romantic comedy films
2010s Tagalog-language films
Regal Entertainment films
2014 romantic comedy films
2010s English-language films
Films directed by Jun Robles Lana